The 2007 Nippon Professional Baseball season was the 58th season since the NPB was reorganized in .

Regular season

Standings

Central League

Pacific League

Climax Series 

Climax Series was firstly introduced in this season. It was inspired by the playoff system introduced by Pacific League between 2004 and 2006, in which the top three teams of the league will play in a stepladder knockout to decide the team to play in the Japan Series. The system was a success when Pacific League's teams won all the Japan Series since the introduction of such system. This is also the Central League's first participation in playoff system since 1949.

Climax Series does not affect the team's standings, nor individual's record in the Regular Season.

 – Chunichi Dragons advances to 2007 Konami Cup

Leaders

Batting
Central League

*indicates league record

Pacific League

Awards

Best Nine Awards
Central League

Pacific League

Gold Gloves
Central League

Pacific League

See also
2007 Korea Professional Baseball season
2007 Major League Baseball season

References
Central League Standings (Japanese)
Pacific League Standings (Japanese)